Wycombe is a constituency in Buckinghamshire represented in the House of Commons of the UK Parliament since 2010 by Steve Baker, a Conservative.

Constituency profile 
The constituency shares similar borders with Wycombe local government district, although it covers a slightly smaller area. The main town within the constituency, High Wycombe contains many working/middle class voters and a sizeable ethnic minority population that totals around one quarter of the town's population, with some census output areas of town home to over 50% ethnic minorities, and a number of wards harbouring a considerable Labour vote. The surrounding villages, which account for just under half of the electorate, are some of the most wealthy areas in the country, with extremely low unemployment, high incomes and favour the Conservatives.  Workless claimants totalled 3.0% of the population in November 2012, lower than the national average of 3.8%.

The seat bucked the trend in 2019 with a swing of 2.3% to the Labour Party in spite of their heavy general election defeat, and is now looked on as a key Blue Wall marginal constituency in the next general election.

History
The Parliamentary Borough of Chipping Wycombe had continuously returned two MPs to the House of Commons since the Model Parliament of 1295. This was reduced to 1 MP by the Representation of the People Act 1867 and the Borough was abolished altogether by the Redistribution of Seats Act 1885. It was transformed into a large county division, formally named the Southern or Wycombe Division of Buckinghamshire.  It was one of three divisions formed from the undivided three-member Parliamentary County of Buckinghamshire, the other two being the Mid or Aylesbury Division and the Northern or Buckingham Division.  As well as the abolished Borough, it absorbed the abolished Parliamentary Borough of Great Marlow and included the towns of Beaconsfield and Slough.

Boundaries and boundary changes 

1885–1918: The Municipal Borough of Chepping Wycombe, the Sessional Divisions of Burnham and Stoke, and parts of the first and second Sessional Divisions of Desborough.

1918–1945: The Municipal Borough of Chepping Wycombe, the Urban Districts of Eton, Marlow, and Slough, the Rural Districts of Eton and Hambleden, and part of the Rural District of Wycombe.

Beaconsfield was transferred to Aylesbury.  Gained Eton which had been part of the abolished Parliamentary Borough of New Windsor in Berkshire.

1945–1950: The Municipal Borough of Chepping Wycombe, the Urban District of Marlow, and the Rural District of Wycombe.

The House of Commons (Redistribution of Seats) Act 1944 set up Boundaries Commissions to carry out periodic reviews of the distribution of parliamentary constituencies. It also authorised an initial review to subdivide abnormally large constituencies in time for the 1945 election.  This was implemented by the Redistribution of Seats Order 1945 under which Buckinghamshire was allocated an additional seat.  As a consequence, the new County Constituency of Eton and Slough was formed from the Wycombe constituency, comprising the Municipal Borough of Slough and the Urban and Rural Districts of Eton.  In compensation, the parts of the (revised) Rural District of Wycombe in the Aylesbury Division, including Hughenden and Princes Risborough, were transferred to Wycombe.

1950–1974: The Municipal Borough of High Wycombe, the Urban District of Marlow, and the Rural District of Wycombe.

No changes to boundaries.

1974–1983: The Municipal Borough of High Wycombe, the Urban District of Marlow, and in the Rural District of Wycombe the parishes of Chepping Wycombe, Fawley, Fingest and Lane End, Great Marlow, Hambleden, Hughenden, Little Marlow, Medmenham, Turville, and West Wycombe Rural.

Northern parts of the Rural District of Wycombe, including Princes Risborough, but excluding Hughenden, transferred back to Aylesbury.  Wooburn included in the new County Constituency of Beaconsfield.

1983–1997: The District of Wycombe wards of Booker and Castlefield, Bowerdean and Daws Hill, Cressex and Frogmoor, Downley, Great Marlow, Green Hill and Totteridge, Hambleden Valley, Hughenden Valley, Keep Hill and Hicks Farm, Kingshill, Lane End and Piddington, Little Marlow, Marlow Bottom, Marlow North, Marlow South, Marsh and Micklefield, Oakridge and Tinkers Wood, and West Wycombe and Sands.

Areas to the east of High Wycombe (former parish of Chepping Wycombe) transferred to Beaconsfield.  Hazlemere transferred to Chesham and Amersham.

1997–2010: The District of Wycombe wards of Booker and Castlefield, Bowerdean and Daws Hill, Cressex and Frogmoor, Downley, Great Marlow, Green Hill and Totteridge, Hambleden Valley, Hughenden Valley, Keep Hill and Hicks Farm, Kingshill, Lane End and Piddington, Marlow Bottom, Marlow North, Marlow South, Marsh and Micklefield, Oakridge and Tinkers Wood, and West Wycombe and Sands.

Minor changes.

2010–present: The District of Wycombe wards of Abbey, Booker and Cressex, Bowerdean, Chiltern Rise, Disraeli, Downley and Plomer Hill, Greater Marlow, Hambleden Valley, Hazlemere North, Hazlemere South, Micklefield, Oakridge and Castlefield, Ryemead, Sands, Terriers and Amersham Hill, Totteridge, and Tylers Green and Loudwater.

Hazlemere transferred back from Chesham and Amersham.  Marlow transferred to Beaconsfield and Hughenden to Aylesbury.

Members of Parliament

MPs 1295–1640 
 Constituency created (1295)

MPs 1640–1868

MPs 1868–present 
Reduced to one member (1868)

Elections

Elections in the 2010s 

 

This constituency underwent boundary changes between the 2005 and 2010 general elections and thus calculation of change in vote share is not meaningful.

Elections in the 2000s

Elections in the 1990s

Elections in the 1980s 

This constituency underwent boundary changes between the 1979 and 1983 general elections and thus calculation of change in vote share is not meaningful.

Elections in the 1970s 

This constituency underwent boundary changes between the 1970 and February 1974 general elections and thus calculation of change in vote share is not meaningful.

Elections in the 1960s

Elections in the 1950s

Election in the 1940s 

A general election was expected 1939–40 and by 1939 the following had been adopted as candidates;
Conservative: Alfred Knox
Labour: Ernest Whitfield
Liberal: Vaughan Watkins
In 1938, the local Labour and Liberal parties had set up a formal organisation, 'The South Bucks Unity Committee' in support of a Popular Front and may well have agreed to support a joint candidate against the sitting Conservative.

Election in the 1930s

Election in the 1920s

Elections 1868–1918

Elections in the 1910s

Elections in the 1900s

Elections in the 1890s 

 Caused by Curzon's appointment as Treasurer of the Household.

Elections in the 1880s 

 Caused by Carington's appointment as a Groom in Waiting.

Elections in the 1870s

Elections in the 1860s

Elections 1832–1868

Elections in the 1860s

 Caused by Carrington's succession to the peerage, becoming Lord Carrington.

 Caused by Dashwood's death.

Elections in the 1850s

Elections in the 1840s

Elections in the 1830s

 

 Caused by Smith's succession to the peerage, becoming 2nd Baron Carrington

 
 

 

 

 

 

 

 Caused by Baring's resignation

See also 
 List of parliamentary constituencies in Buckinghamshire

Notes

References

Further reading 
GENUKI
Robert Beatson, A Chronological Register of Both Houses of Parliament (London: Longman, Hurst, Res & Orme, 1807)  A Chronological Register of Both Houses of the British Parliament, from the Union in 1708, to the Third Parliament of the United Kingdom of Great Britain and Ireland, in 1807
D. Brunton & D. H. Pennington, Members of the Long Parliament (London: George Allen & Unwin, 1954)
Cobbett's Parliamentary history of England, from the Norman Conquest in 1066 to the year 1803 (London: Thomas Hansard, 1808) titles A-Z
 The Constitutional Year Book for 1913 (London: National Union of Conservative and Unionist Associations, 1913)
F. W. S. Craig, British Parliamentary Election Results 1832–1885 (2nd edition, Aldershot: Parliamentary Research Services, 1989)

Parliamentary constituencies in Buckinghamshire
Constituencies of the Parliament of the United Kingdom established in 1295
High Wycombe
Wycombe District